Lady Franklinfjorden is a fjord in Gustav V Land at Nordaustlandet, Svalbard. The fjord has a length of about 25 kilometers. Lady Franklinfjorden is named after Jane Franklin, the wife of Arctic explorer John Franklin.

References

Fjords of Svalbard
Nordaustlandet